Adrian Robert Todd Turnbull (born 28 May 1934) was a rugby union player who represented Australia.

Turnbull, a wing, was born in Edmonton and claimed 1 international rugby cap for Australia at the 3rd Wallabies v Fiji, Test in Melbourne, 1961.

References

Australian rugby union players
Australia international rugby union players
1934 births
Living people
Rugby union wings